Mount Lyall may refer to:

 Mount Lyall (Canadian Rockies), at the border of British-Columbia and Alberta, in Canada
 Mount Lyall (Quebec), mount in Gaspésie, in Quebec, Canada